The 2018 election for mayor of Sylhet City Corporation was held on 30 July 2018. Sylhet is a city in Bangladesh. The result was again a victory for the Bangladesh Nationalist Party candidate Ariful Haque Choudhury.

Mayoral election results

References 

Sylhet
Sylhet City Corporation
Local elections in Bangladesh